Spilarctia kareli is a moth in the family Erebidae. It was described by Thomas in 1993. It is found on Mindanao in the Philippines.

References

K
Endemic fauna of the Philippines
Moths of the Philippines
Moths described in 1993